The Brazilian snapper, (Lutjanus alexandrei) is a species of snapper native to the tropical waters of the Atlantic off the coast of Brazil.

Taxonomy
The Brazilian snapper was first formally described in 2007 by the Brazilian marine biologist Rodrigo Leão de Moura and the American marine scientist Kenyon C. Lindeman with the type locality given as Camurupim Reef near Tamandaré in Pernambuco State, Brazil. The specific name honours the pioneering Brazilian naturalist  Alexandre Rodrigues Ferreira.

Description 
The Brazilian snapper has a relatively deep body which has a mean depth which is around 40% of its standard length. It has a long pointed, snout and a large terminal mouth which is protractile. There is a row of conical teeth on each jaw with the anterior pair in the upper jaw enlarged into fang-like teeth which are visible when the mouth is closed. There are also  pairs of canine-like pointed conical teeth in lower jaw. The vomerine teeth are arranged in an anchor-shaped patch, having an obvious extension  behind its centre. The dorsal fin is continuous with 10 spines in its anterior portion and 14 soft rays in its posterior portion, there is a slight notch at the boundary between the spiny and soft rayed parts of the fin. The anal fin has 3 spines and 8 soft rays. The preoperculum is serrated and has a poorly developed notch and knob. This species is variable in colour but normally they are reddish marked with more or less clear vertical bands on the body and sometimes a diagonal band over the eye. The blue spots which are present on the faces of this species allow it to be identified in comparison with similar species, these run in an irregular line from the corner of the mouth to the edge of the operculum with another a brief row behind the eye and a small number dispersed on the cheek.

Distribution and habitat 
The Brazilian snapper is found in the western Atlantic Ocean where it is endemic to the coast of Brazil. It has been recorded from the state of Maranhão to the southern coast of the state of Bahia in the Northeast Region. Juveniles are commoner in mamgroves and other shallow water habitats, often in mixed schools with juvenile dog snapper (L. jocu).

Biology 
The Brazilian snapper,  like other snappers, is a nocturnal predator and the adults are found either solitarily or in groups on reefs during the day, often mixed with dog snappers.

References

Brazilian snapper
Taxa named by Rodrigo Leão de Moura
Taxa named by Kenyon C. Lindeman
Fish described in 2007